Charles Coote, 2nd Earl of Mountrath (c.1630 – 30 August 1672) was an Anglo-Irish politician and peer.

Coote was the son of Charles Coote, 1st Earl of Mountrath and Mary Ruish, daughter of Sir Francis Ruish. He was knighted in 1660. Between April and December 1661 he briefly served as the Member of Parliament for Roscommon County in the Irish House of Commons, before inheriting his father's title and assuming his seat in the Irish House of Lords. In 1662 Coote was granted a general pardon by Charles II of England for his support of  The Protectorate. In 1662 he received a commission as a captain of foot in the Irish Army.

Coote married Alice Meredyth, daughter of Sir Robert Meredyth, in June 1653. He was succeeded in his title by his only son, Charles Coote. His daughter, Anne, married Murrough Boyle, 1st Viscount Blesington.

References

Year of birth uncertain
1672 deaths
17th-century Anglo-Irish people
Earls in the Peerage of Ireland
Irish knights
Irish soldiers
Irish MPs 1661–1666
Members of the Irish House of Lords
Members of the Parliament of Ireland (pre-1801) for County Roscommon constituencies